The acronym SGAA could refer to:

 the Sudan Government Administration Area, another name for the Halaib triangle, on the border of Egypt and Sudan
 the Sandy Gall Afghanistan Appeal